John William Fisher (born February 15, 1931, in Ancell, Missouri) is a professor emeritus of civil engineering.

Biography
John W. Fisher served from 1951 to 1953 in the U.S. Army Corps of Engineers, where he attained the rank of 2nd lieutenant. After graduating with a B.S. in civil engineering from Washington University in St. Louis in 1956, he became a graduate student in civil engineering at Lehigh University, where he graduated in 1958 with an M.S. From 1958 to 1961 he worked as assistant bridge research engineer working for the National Academy of Sciences in Ottawa, Illinois at the facility of the American Association of State Highway and Transportation Officials Road Test. In 1961 he returned to Lehigh University as a research assistant and graduate student, graduating with a Ph.D. in 1964. He then joined the civil engineering faculty at Lehigh University as an associate professor and was promoted to full professor in 1969, retiring as professor emeritus in 2002. He was Lehigh University's Joseph T. Stuart Professor of Engineerg for almost twenty years. In 1986 he was the founding director of Lehigh University's Advanced Technology for Large Structural Systems (ATLSS) Center.

He was elected in 1986 a member of the National Academy of Engineering. He was named in 1987 "Construction Man of the Year" by Engineering News Record (ENR). He received in 1988 an honorary doctorate from the Swiss Federal Institute of Technology in Lausanne. He was awarded in 1992 the Franklin Institute's Frank P. Brown Medal for "forensic engineering and fatigue of materials."

In 2000 he received both the Roy W. Crum Award from the Transportation Research Board and the John Fritz Medal from the American Association of Engineering Societies. From 2001 to 2002 he served on a FEMA panel of national experts that investigated the collapse of the World Trade Center following the September 11 attacks. In 2020 he received the IABSE's Award of Merit.

On October 11, 1952, in Scott County, Missouri, he married Nelda Rae Adams (born 1933). There are four children from the marriage.

Selected publications

References

1931 births
Living people
American civil engineers
American bridge engineers
Washington University in St. Louis alumni
Lehigh University alumni
Lehigh University faculty
Members of the United States National Academy of Engineering